Buffering the Vampire Slayer is a podcast about the TV series, Buffy the Vampire Slayer. Hosted by fans Jenny Owen Youngs and Kristin Russo. Each podcast episode analyzes one episode of Buffy the Vampire Slayer, and concludes with an original song created by Youngs and Russo recapping their analysis. There are also notable interviews featuring actors and collaborators from the series.

Hosts 
Kristin Russo (born December 17, 1980) is an American speaker, personality, and LGBT activist. She is the CEO and editor-in-chief of Everyone Is Gay and My Kid Is Gay. She also supports organizations that provide advice, guidance, and education to LGBTQIA youth and their families; and is the co-author of This Is a Book for Parents of Gay Kids (Chronicle Books, 2014).

Jenny Owen Youngs (born November 22, 1981) is an American singer-songwriter. She has released three albums and several EPs, both independently and via Nettwerk Records, and has toured worldwide. Youngs also collaborated with artists such as Brett Dennen, Ingrid Michaelson, Shungudzo, Pitbull. She is a co-writer on the 2018 Panic! at the Disco single, "High Hopes". 

Youngs and Russo were married when the podcast began, though they separated in May 2018. They have been described as contributing to a "golden age of queer women in podcasting".

Music 
Each episode of Buffering includes an original song by Youngs and Russo, reflecting the episode discussed. All songs from completed seasons of the podcast are compiled into albums that are available on Spotify and Apple Music. The lyrics are also published on the Buffering the Vampire Slayer website.

Youngs and Russo have also created jingles honouring specific characters from the Buffyverse, including Spike, Giles, and Vampire Willow.

Guests 
Special interviews and appearances on Buffering the Vampire Slayer have included:

 Kate Leth, who provided sporadic "Buffy Fashion Watch" segments to the show
 Armin Shimerman, who played Principal Snyder in Seasons 1–3 of Buffy
 Kristine Sutherland, who played Buffy's mother, Joyce Summers, in Seasons 1–5 of Buffy
 Harry Groener, who played Mayor Richard Wilkins III in Season 3 of Buffy
 Nerf Herder, the band who wrote the Buffy theme song 
 Doug Jones, who played the leader of the Gentleman in the Season 4 episode "Hush" 
 James Marsters, who played Spike in Seasons 2–7 of Buffy and Seasons 1, 2, and 5 of Angel 
 Sophia Crawford, who was the stunt double for Sarah Michelle Gellar in Seasons 1–4 of Buffy 
 Jeff Pruitt, who was the stunt coordinator on Seasons 1–4 of Buffy
 Lindsay Crouse, who played Professor Maggie Walsh in Season 4 of Buffy 
 David Wells, who played the Cheese Man in the Season 4 episode "Restless" 
 Seth Green, who played Daniel "Oz" Osbourne in Seasons 2–4 of Buffy and Season 1 of Angel 
 Charisma Carpenter, who played Cordelia Chase on Seasons 1–3 of Buffy and every season of Angel
 Mercedes McNab, who played Harmony in Seasons 1-5 of Buffy and Seasons 2 and 5 of Angel

Motivation 
Russo and Young's motivation to create the podcast was based on their interests in fandom, science fiction and queer politics. According to the duo, they "wanted to make a Buffy podcast forever" to navigate these topics in relation to the series. The podcasts often focuses on the politics and social movements within Buffy, including "analyzing the lack of racial diversity in the early seasons of the show, misogynistic and patriarchal themes as they pop up, and the queer subtext".

Reception 
The podcast has received praise for its narrative and presentation. It was included on Esquire magazine's "21 Best Podcasts of 2018,"Time magazine's "The 50 Best Podcasts to Listen to Right Now",BuzzFeed's "27 Podcasts You Need to Listening to in 2018", and Autostraddle's "14 Best Podcasts For Escaping News & Politics (2017)", and top 9 queer-run podcasts.

Community 
Buffering the Vampire Slayer is financially supported by over 2,000 patrons on Patreon.

It has also hosted a number of community events, including live episode recordings and the "Buffy Proms" of 2018 and 2019.

Spin-offs 
Upon Buffering's commencement of Buffy Season 4 coverage, a spin-off podcast, Angel on Top, was created. Angel on Top was hosted by Brittany Ashley and Laura Zak in seasons 1-2,and is currently hosted by LaToya Ferguson and Morgan Luditch. The show derives its name from a line in the Buffy the Vampire Slayer episode "Amends". This particular spin-off podcast discusses the TV show Angel. Buffering the Vampire Slayer and Angel on Top are released on alternating weeks.

References

External links 
 
 Episode transcriptions

Film and television podcasts
LGBT-related podcasts
Buffy the Vampire Slayer
Television fandom
2016 podcast debuts